The 13th Democratic Party of Japan leadership election was held on 16 May 2009 after the incumbent party leader Ichirō Ozawa announced that he would resign in early May 2009. Ozawa had been expected to lead the DPJ into a possible election victory over the long-time incumbent Liberal Democratic Party later in 2009, but a corruption scandal had forced him to resign in order to save the party's chances.

Possible replacements included the perceived frontrunner Katsuya Okada (known especially for his support of tougher climate policies), current deputy leaders and former leaders Naoto Kan and Yukio Hatoyama, as well as the conservative security policy expert Seiji Maehara. Okada (who was seen as a reformer) and Hatoyama (seen as likely to continue Ozawa's policies) officially announced their candidacies on 14 May 2009. According to surveys, Okada was more popular with the voters, while Hatoyama had more support from DPJ lawmakers, who were to make the decision. As predicted, Hatoyama was elected with 124 votes over Okada's 95.

Results

 1 invalid vote
 1 absent

References

2009 elections in Japan
Political party leadership elections in Japan
Indirect elections
Democratic Party (Japan, 1998) leadership election